Lite Flite is an album by pianist Kenny Drew recorded in 1977 and released on the SteepleChase label.

Track listing
All compositions by Kenny Drew except as indicated
 "Yesterdays" (Otto Harbach, Jerome Kern) – 5:08   
 "Only You" – 6:48   
 "Precious Lady" (Per Goldschmidt) – 8:17   
 "All Your Words" (Idrees Sulieman) – 6:22   
 "Bossa Mood" – 8:01   
 "Lite Flite" – 8:14   
 "Precious Lady" [take 3] (Goldschmidt) – 8:18 Bonus track on CD

Personnel
Kenny Drew – piano
Thad Jones – flugelhorn, cornet
Bob Berg – tenor saxophone
George Mraz – bass
Jimmy Cobb – drums

References

Kenny Drew albums
1977 albums
SteepleChase Records albums